Mungolian Jet Set is a Norwegian electronic music duo consisting of DJ and turntablist Pål "Strangefruit" Nyhus and producer Knut Sævik.

Mythology
The group have also created a kind of personal mythology, reminiscent of George Clinton's Funkadelic and Parliament, some of which has been used in their recordings, sleevenotes and website. This includes a fabricated mythical language they call "Mung Su", various characters including a linguist named Ronald P. Hardaker, an allegedly ancient order of Knights called "The Knights of Jumungus", and numerous others based on occasional collaborators.

On their website they have also initiated a Halo 3 Clan under the moniker of "The Noble Order of The Knights Of Jumungus" in order to perform battle reenactments from the artificial history of the Mungolians.

They also have an alleged "Mungolian" providing them with a blog ("The Homunculus"), which is usually critical in tone of humanity and its pastimes, culture and various social and political machinations. In contrast, they also have a character named "The Dhaqwaan of Po-Lonte" who acts as official bard, scattering epigrams and short poems throughout their website and sleevenotes, as well as contributing "special poetry" to the track "Y Lentokone Mungo" on their second album, "We Gave It All Away... Now We Are Taking It Back". This poetry previously appeared as an untranslated sleevenote on their first album (which they often refer to as their "difficult third album", an asynchronous anomaly their mythology attributes to DJ Strangefruit's ability to bend time through the use of his turntables), "Beauty Came To Us In Stone." No translation of this text has yet been supplied, although they collectively maintain there is one in existence.

Occasionally, mention is made of a "mad Irish writer" who collaborates with them. Credits on their second and third albums suggest this writer may be named "Dave Mullan," but as no confirmation or denial has been issued by either the band or the writer, this cannot be stated with certainty. The sleevenotes included on their most recent album, "Mungodelics", is presumably from the same source as the rest of their mythology, but as there is no accreditation, it remains uncertain.

Cover artwork
The artwork of their second and third albums ("We Gave It All Away ... Now We Are Taking It Back" and "Schlungs!") and many of the releases of DJ Strangefruit's own record label, Luna Flicks, was created by Suzie Webb, an English expatriate artist and designer living in Oslo, Norway. For their fourth album ("Mungodelics"), the cover was designed by Kim Hiorthøy, who has designed many of the album covers for the label Smalltown Supersound.

Beauty Came To Us In Stone
This album is a collective effort, guided by Pål Nyhus and Reidar Skaar primarily, with some contributions from Knut Sævik. Initially a commissioned jazz album for Bugge Wesseltoft's Jazzland Recordings  label, it soon evolved from the tribute to electric era Miles Davis it was intended to be into a densely woven pastiche of innumerable elements.

We Gave It All Away ... Now We Are Taking It Back
Their second album moved away from the Jazz-based sound of its predecessor, and saw Knut Sævik take a leading role in the group, effectively replacing Reidar Skaar. The more club-oriented sound also meant the band moved from Jazzland Recordings to Smalltown Supersound, a label whose roster and aesthetic seemed to be a better home for the Psychedelic Disco music they were aiming to create. The album consists of a few original tracks interspersed with tracks that began as remixes of others, but were remixed a second or even third time to create a more consistent sound. The album covers two CDs with 8 tracks per disk, and each disk timed at 59 minutes and 15 seconds.

Schlungs!
Their third album took a different approach from its predecessors in that some of the material had a distinct element of pop music. While the psychedelic aspects were to the fore on some tracks, traditional disco played a major role, particularly in tracks such as "Bella Lanay", "We Are The Shining" (a commentary on the use of Illuminati imagery in mainstream pop), and "Ties n Downs". Critical opinion was sharply divided by these "lighter" moments, where, for example, Pitchfork said "Here, the music frequently scales down to more human dimensions, at which point the silliness starts to resemble that of real humans: flushed with an over-enthusiastic pleasure you can observe but not share, and at times a bit uncomfortable to be in the same room as". By contrast, Resident Advisor said "'Schlungs' scans more like the art-pop of 10cc's 'How Dare You' than an introverted journey like 'The Wall'. This is due in no small part to the inclusion of 'Bella Lenay'" [sic]. However, the album was a commercial success, and paved the way for a rapid follow-up.

Mungodelics
The fourth album marked a return to the remix-revised/reclaimed aesthetic of their second album, this time adding some original pieces, and some pieces by spin-off project, The Knights Of Jumungus (originally a Halo Clan). The overall tone is heavier than releases since their debut for Jazzland Recordings. Reviews were generally positive, although some (e.g. exclaim.ca) felt that the band were repeating themselves. However, Allmusic.com said "Above all, Mungodelics practically bubbles with undisguised joy in the moment, a pleasure in activity, and the possibilities they explore" which is a common theme in most reviews.

Work in progress
The band are working on a fifth album, as yet untitled. The only information thus far available suggests that it will be a full studio album, containing some retro-thematic concepts that go far beyond the 60s/70s/80s references they have littered their work with, music that stretches their already expansive sampling and stylistic composing, and most indications suggest a heightened presence of the "excess" that has come to define them above all other considerations. The album will be a direct follow-on from "Schlungs" in the same way that "Mungodelics" followed "We Gave It All Away ... Now We Are Taking It Back".

Discography
Beauty Came to Us in Stone (2006)
We Gave It All Away... Now We Are Taking It Back (2009)
Schlungs (2011)
Mungodelics (2012)

Notes
a. The group often alternates between using a space ("Jet Set") and omitting one ("Jetset").

External links
Official site

Norwegian electronic music groups
Norwegian dance music groups
Club DJs
Remixers
Electronic music duos

Musical groups with year of establishment missing 
Musical groups from Norway with local place of origin missing
Jazzland Recordings (1997) artists